Bandan may refer to:
 Bandan, Sistan and Baluchestan
 Bandan, Boshruyeh, South Khorasan
 Bandan, Nehbandan, South Khorasan
 Bandan Rural District, in South Khorasan Province

See also
 Ban Dan (disambiguation), several places in Thailand